Samuel or Sam Walters may refer to:

Samuel Walters (artist) (1811–1882), English maritime artist
Sam Walters (director) (born 1939), British theatre director
Sam Walters (rugby league) (born 2000), English rugby league footballer
Samuel Walters, candidate for Burin—Burgeo electoral district

See also
Sam Waters (disambiguation)